HNLMS De Zeven Provinciën (F802) is the first ship of the  air defence and command frigates in service with the Royal Netherlands Navy (RNLN). De Zeven Provinciën is the eighth ship in the Royal Netherlands Navy to carry this name. The name refers to the original seven Dutch provinces which together formed the Union of Utrecht.

She was built by Damen Schelde Naval Shipbuilding (formerly the Koninklijke Schelde Groep) in Vlissingen. Her design incorporates stealth technology, as well as advanced radars of Dutch design such as SMART-L and APAR.

As of December 2009, Commander Hugo L.J. Ammerlaan is De Zeven Provinciëns commanding officer.

Operational history

On 21 March 2006, the container ship  suffered a major explosion and massive fire in the aft on-deck container stacks. When efforts to control the fire failed, the crew abandoned ship and were picked up by De Zeven Provinciën. 

On 4 April 2006, De Zeven Provinciën along with the destroyer  responded to MV Dong Won which reported that it had came under rocket attack off the coast of Somalia. However, the pirates had already hijacked the vessel and reached Somali territorial waters after threatening the captured crew. De Zeven Provinciën and Roosevelt continued to monitor the situation.

On 29 March 2009, as De Zeven Provinciën was part of Operation Atalanta, the German Navy tanker  was attacked by 7-man pirate boat. Spessart had a 12-man security detail which exchanged fire with the pirates which repelled the attack. The pirates were later captured after a chase lasting a few hours.

De Zeven Provinciën provided security during the 2014 Nuclear Security Summit.

De Zeven Provinciën participated in Exercise Formidable Shield 2021. During the exercise, she fired two RIM-162 ESSM and assisted  in intercepting a ballistic missile using its SMART-L radar.

Between March–July 2022, De Zeven Provinciën was part of Standing NATO Maritime Group 1. She had port calls in Tallinn and Devonport.

On 9 October 2022, De Zeven Provinciën along with  deployed to conduct drills with the aircraft carrier .

Live missile firings
De Zeven Provinciën carries the Evolved Sea Sparrow Missile (ESSM) and the SM-2 Block IIIA missile systems. The primary sensor used to guide these missile systems is APAR.

The firings involved a single ESSM and a single SM-2. These firings were particularly significant in that they were the first ever live firings involving a full-size ship-borne Active Electronically Scanned Array (i.e., APAR) guiding missiles using the Interrupted Continuous Wave Illumination (ICWI) technique in an operational environment. As related by Jane's Navy International:

The tests involved three live-firing events including firing a single SM-2 at an Iris target drone at long range, a single ESSM at an Iris target drone, and a two-salvo launch (with one salvo comprising two SM-2s and the other comprising two ESSMs) against two incoming Iris target drones.

The  intercepted and destroyed the ballistic missile with SM-3 surface-to-air missile.

Gallery

References

External links

 
 

 

De Zeven Provinciën-class frigates
Frigates of the Netherlands
2000 ships
Ships built in Vlissingen